Ray Feinga (born May 8, 1986) is an American football guard who is currently a free agent. He was signed by the St. Louis Rams as an undrafted free agent in 2009. He played college football at BYU.

Feinga has also been a member of the San Diego Chargers.

Early years

Feinga was an All-State selection as a senior and led Hunter High School, West Valley City, Utah to the State Championship. He was named 2003 Mr. Football in the state of Utah as a senior and Gatorade player of the year. He was selected to the U.S Army All-American Bowl. Additionally, he was named Hunter's Most Valuable Player and earned region defensive player of the year and MVP. He was an All-State and All-Region selection as a junior as well after recording more than 70 tackles and nine sacks on defense.

College career
Feinga was a two-time First-team All-Mountain West Conference pick at left guard while at BYU. He was also a Second-team All-America selection in 2007. Feinga redshirted as a true freshman in 2004. In 2005, he played in eight games during the season with one start.  As a sophomore, he played in all 13 games and started at left guard in 10 games. In 2007, he started 12 of 13 games at left guard for the Cougars. He did not allow a single sack all season despite recording more than 70 knock-down blocks. He was named All-Mountain West Conference for his efforts. He was again All-MWC in 2008 as a senior after starting all 13 games in 2008 at left guard.

Professional career

Pre-draft
The 6-4⅛, 337 pound Feinga did 30 reps at 225 pounds at the NFL Combine. Feinga did not participate in any of the agility drills at the BYU Pro Day due to a pulled his left hamstring and only lifted.

St. Louis Rams
On April 27, 2009, Feinga was signed by the St. Louis Rams as an undrafted free agent. He was waived on July 1.

San Diego Chargers
Feinga signed with the San Diego Chargers on August 13, 2009 but was cut during final cuts on September 5.

Miami Dolphins
Feinga was signed to the practice squad of the Miami Dolphins on December 15, 2009. After his contract expired at season's end he was re-signed to a future contract on January 5, 2010. He was waived on September 4, 2010. On September 29, Feinga was added to the active roster, he was waived on October 4. He was suspended for four games the following day. Feinga returned to the practice squad following the suspension and on December 8, 2010 was signed to the Dolphins 53 man active roster after Al Harris was put on season ending IR. On September 8, 2011, he was waived by Miami. Feinga was added to the practice squad on September 20, 2011. Feinga was added back to the active roster on November 30, 2011. On August 31, 2012 Feinga was released by Miami. On September 4, 2012, Feinga was re-signed by Miami after releasing QB David Garrard. On September 25, 2012 Feinga was released by Miami.

San Jose SaberCats
Feinga was assigned to the San Jose SaberCats of the Arena Football League on December 20, 2013.

References

External links

Miami Dolphins bio
BYU Cougars bio

1986 births
Living people
American people of Tongan descent
People from West Valley City, Utah
Players of American football from Utah
American football offensive guards
BYU Cougars football players
St. Louis Rams players
San Diego Chargers players
San Jose SaberCats players
Sportspeople from the San Francisco Bay Area
Miami Dolphins players
People from San Bruno, California
Players of American football from California